Bhairab Dutt Pandey  (17 March 1917 – 2009) was a member of the Indian Civil Service and Union Cabinet Secretary of the Government of India under Indira Gandhi. He served as the Governor of West Bengal (1981–1983), and Punjab (1983–1984), and the Administrator of Chandigarh for a brief period.

Born in Almora, in the Indian state of Uttarakhand, Pandey served as a Cabinet Secretary to the Union Government from 2 November 1972 to 31 March 1977. When President's rule was imposed on Punjab, he served as the Governor of the state.

Pandey was married to Vimla Pande. They had three children: Arvind Pandey, IAS, environmentalist Lalit Pandey, and Ratna Pandey. His brother-in-law, Vinod Chandra Pandey, was also a former Governor and Union Cabinet Secretary and Kamal Pande, also a former Cabinet Secretary is a relative of him.

He was one of the last living members of the Imperial Civil Service, having entered in the 1939 batch.

The Government of India awarded Pandey the fourth highest civilian honour of the Padma Shri, in 1972, for his contributions to Indian society and the Padma Vibhushan in 2000.

References 

1917 births
2009 deaths
Recipients of the Padma Vibhushan in civil service
Recipients of the Padma Shri in civil service
Indian Administrative Service officers
Kumaoni people
Governors of Punjab, India
Governors of West Bengal
Politicians from Kolkata
Uttarakhand politicians
People from Almora
Indian Civil Service (British India) officers